Eucithara caledonica is a small sea snail, a marine gastropod mollusk in the family Mangeliidae.

Description
The length of the shell attains 6 mm.

The subquadrate-ovate shell has a stout build and contains 8 whorls. It has a pure white colour. It shows fine and even revolving threads, and especially by having only six ribs, including the varix, on the body whorl. The outer lip  is incrassate, but the inner part is smooth, and is slightly insinuate at the suture. The siphonal canal is very short and slight recurved.

Distribution
This marine species occurs off New Caledonia,  Queensland (Australia).and Taiwan.

References

 Smith, E.A. (1882a) Diagnoses of new species of Pleurotomidae in the British Museum. Annals and Magazine of Natural History, series 5, 10, 206–218
 Bouge, L.J. & Dautzenberg, P.L. 1914. Les Pleurotomides de la Nouvelle-Caledonie et de ses dependances. Journal de Conchyliologie 61: 123-214

External links
  Tucker, J.K. 2004 Catalog of recent and fossil turrids (Mollusca: Gastropoda). Zootaxa 682:1-1295

caledonica
Gastropods described in 1882